Events during the year 2018 in Bhutan.

Incumbents
 Monarch: Jigme Khesar Namgyel Wangchuck
 Prime Minister: Tshering Tobgay (until 9 August), Tshering Wangchuk (9 August–7 November), Lotay Tshering (starting 7 November)

References

 
Bhutan
Bhutan
2010s in Bhutan
Years of the 21st century in Bhutan